Huaiyang or Jianghuai cuisine is one of the Four Great Traditions in Chinese cuisine. It is derived from the native cooking styles of the region surrounding the lower reaches of the Huai and Yangtze rivers and centered on the cities of Huai'an, Yangzhou and Zhenjiang in Jiangsu Province. Although it is one of several sub-regional styles within Jiangsu cuisine, Huaiyang cuisine is widely seen in Chinese culinary circles as the most popular and prestigious style of Jiangsu cuisine – to a point where it is considered to be one of the Four Great Traditions that dominate the culinary heritage of China, along with Cantonese cuisine, Shandong cuisine and Sichuan cuisine.

Typical features
Huaiyang cuisine is characterized by basing each dish on its main ingredient; the way that ingredient is cut is pivotal to its cooking and its final taste. The cuisine is also known for employing Chinkiang vinegar, which is produced in the Jiangsu region. Huaiyang cuisine tends to have a slightly sweet side to it and is almost never spicy, in contrast to some cuisines of China (like Sichuan or Hunan). Pork, chicken, and freshwater aquatic products serve as the protein base in most dishes, which are usually more meticulous and light.

Notable dishes
Huaiyang cuisine also includes several breakfast choices such as crab soup dumplings, thousand-layer cake, steamed dumplings, and wild vegetable steamed buns.

Other standard dishes of Huaiyang cuisine include:

Others include Yangzhou pickles,  (sliced tofu), sticky candy, ginkgo, Qionghuayu liquor, Nanshan green tea,  lotus root starch, and Jiangdu short pastry.

 is a type of steamed bun with meat or paste fillings. It is sometimes served for breakfast and is best eaten hot.

There is also a dish called "Beggar's Chicken", which is a whole chicken marinated with spices and wrapped in aluminum foil. Contrary to its name, it is not the food for the homeless. Traditionally, beggar's chicken is wrapped in leaves or sometimes even in mud, thus allowing the full flavor of the chicken to be preserved.

Because Yangzhou is close to Nanjing, people will be able to enjoy the mix of northern and southern cuisines. When in Nanjing, one unusual local dish is duck blood and vermicelli soup, consisting of congealed duck's blood in noodle soup, another is its stinky tofu.

Use in official dining
Huaiyang cuisine has been employed in official occasions by the Chinese government. Some examples include:

 In 1949, for the first state banquet of the People's Republic of China.
 In 1999, for China's 50th anniversary state banquet.
 In 2002, for visiting U.S. President George W. Bush, hosted by Chinese President and General Secretary of the Chinese Communist Party Jiang Zemin.

See also
 List of Chinese dishes
 Din Tai Fung

References

External links
 Yangzhou and Huaiyang Cuisine

Regional cuisines of China